The San Luis Open, or the Abierto de San Luis, is a golf tournament on the TPG Tour, the official professional golf tour in Argentina. First held in 2002, it has always been held at the Villa Mercedes Golf Club, in Villa Mercedes, San Luis Province. The tournament was included on the Tour de las Americas from 2006 to 2008.

Winners

PO – won following playoff
* – reduced to 54 holes because of rain

External links
Tour de las Americas – official site
TPG Tour – official site

Golf tournaments in Argentina
Tour de las Américas events